Amderma (lit. a walrus rookery in Nenets) is a rural locality (a settlement) in Zapolyarny District of Nenets Autonomous Okrug, Russia, located on the coast of Kara Sea, near the Vaygach Island,  from Naryan-Mar, the administrative center of the autonomous okrug. Population:  .

History
It was established in 1933. Previously an urban-type settlement, it was demoted to a rural locality in November 2005, but its rural status was not officially codified until a law to that effect was passed in April 2015.

Climate
Amderma has a polar climate (ET) with very cool and short summers combined with very long and cold (but by Russian standards not severe) winters. As a result of the lack of regular warm temperatures Amderma is above the tree line. It experiences midnight sun and polar night. However, the cold Arctic Ocean tempers and reduces the heat effect midnight sun brings to inland locations further south such as Naryan-Mar. Winters are very cold for a marine location, but in spite of this there are several marine localities at lower parallels in North America that experience colder January lows than Amderma.

Economy
Fluorite deposits are located in the vicinity of Amderma, but the mines have been abandoned since the 1990s. It is home to the Amderma Airport, a civil airport and military base.

References

External links
An article about Amderma at sevmeteo.ru 

Rural localities in Nenets Autonomous Okrug
Kara Sea
Populated places of Arctic Russia
Populated places established in 1933
1933 establishments in the Soviet Union